Kochanski or Kochański (Polish feminine: Kochańska) is a surname. It may refer to:

 Adam Adamandy Kochański (1631–1700), Polish mathematician
 Grazyna Kochanska, Polish-American developmental psychologist
 Halik Kochanski (born 1962), British historian of Poland
 Kristine Kochanski, fictional character from the Red Dwarf TV series
 Mors Kochanski (1940–2019), Canadian bushman and wilderness survival expert
 Paul Kochanski (1887–1934), Polish violinist (born Paweł Kochański)
 Prakseda Marcelina Kochańska or Marcella Sembrich (1858–1935), Polish soprano
 Władysław Kochański (1918–1980), Polish army officer

See also
 
 

Polish-language surnames